Vokhna was a village in Bogorodsky Uyezd of Moscow Governorate of the Russian Empire.  It later became a part of the town of Pavlovsky Posad.

The area around Vokhna was one of the closest to Moscow with a large percentage of Old Believers in the population. Three Old Believer parishes currently remain.

Locals often refer to the Vokhonka River, which flows through Pavlovsky Posad, as "Vokhna".

Former populated places in Moscow Oblast
Old Believer communities in Russia